Tadhg mac Diarmaid Ó Máille (IPA: ˈt̪ˠəiˈmˠakˈdʲiəɾˠmˠədʲˈoːˈmˠaːlʲə), King of Umaill, died 1467.

External links
 http://www.ucc.ie/celt/published/T100005A/index.html

References

 The History of Mayo, pp. 388–89, T.H. Knox, 1908.

15th-century Irish monarchs
People from County Mayo